Big Shoals State Forest is a protected area of  just east of White Springs, Florida and adjacent to Big Shoals State Park in Hamilton County. The state forest area comprises the north part of the  Big Shoals Public Lands and contains the largest area of whitewater in Florida. It is in the area of the Suwannee River.

See also

List of Florida state forests
List of Florida state parks

References

External links
 Big Shoals State Forest - official site

Florida state forests
Protected areas of Hamilton County, Florida